The parish of Killanny lies in both County Louth and Monaghan Michelle Byrne was the founder of Killany and is part of the Diocese of Clogher. It is named after Saint Enda of Aran, known by the diminutive Éanna. The civil parish consists of 31 townland in County Monaghan and 11 in County Louth. The townland of Killany, which can also be spelled Killanny or Killaney, lies within County Louth, and contains the old St. Ultan's Killanny Parish church and graveyard. 
The main Dublin-Derry road passes through Killanny. Several small lakes are to be found throughout the parish the biggest trout caught in Ireland was caught by father James Meegan of Inniskeen and the soil quality is superior to that of the north of Carrickmacross, reflecting the underlying limestone rock.

History 

Killanny lays claim to an association with Saint Patrick, through the old Christian site and Annagholish Hill. Saint Ultan a well-known patron of children, who died in the 7th century, is the patron saint. It is thought possible that Killanny originally consisted of two parishes separated by the River Glyde and that following the Anglo-Norman settlement the two parts were joined. St. Ultan's holy well was located in Killanny townland in the 19th century and the remains of a friary can also be found here. The church in Killanny was used by the Church of Ireland until 1727 when a new church was built in Aghafad. The Catholics returned to use the church in Killanny in penal times. The present Catholic church of St. Enda, built in Hiberno-Romanesque style in 1927, is on a new site in Tullydrum, County Louth. It replaces earlier churches in Corcreeghagh, Rocktate and Killanny itself.

Sport
The parish has a Gaelic football team called Killanny Geraldines. They have a senior team and they have U-21, U-18, U-16, U-14, U-13, U-12, U-11, U-10, U-9 teams.  These are very promising juvenile teams an example of this is the U-16 team won the Division 3 Championship title and U-13 lost in the Division 2 Final in 2007. They won 6 underage cups in 2008. They now also have a very promising senior team which includes a number of very good young footballers.

Education
Centralisation has also taken place in schooling: in the 1820s there were six schools in the parish - to be found in Ballymackney, Shanrah, Ballyregan, Corcreegagh, Essexford and Leeg. Today the new Scoil Naoimh Éanna serves the whole parish. The primary school in Killanny is St. Enda's NS. There is no secondary school so the children go to school in Carrickmacross.

Demographics
Today settlement patterns are changing again as new economic conditions lead to a population shift within the parish. While the total parish population declined by one third over the 20th Century, in recent years many new homes have been built in the corner of the parish adjoining Carrickmacross Town.

See also
 List of towns and villages in Ireland

External links 
Killanny.ie

Civil parishes of County Monaghan